Alimadol (INN; A-4020) is an opioid analgesic related to methadone which was never marketed.

See also
 Methadone

References

Allylamines
Amines
Analgesics
Mu-opioid receptor agonists
Synthetic opioids